William of Drogheda (died 1245) was an Irish academic and ecclesiastical lawyer.

Life 
A native of Drogheda, Ireland, William was the best known Oxford lawyer of the 13th century. He seems to have often pleaded cases at the University Church of St Mary the Virgin. His posts included rector of the church of Petha (Petham, Kent?) and in 1245 the rector of Grafton Underwood, Northamptonshire. He described himself as a regent in law.

His single work, Summa aurea, is concerned solely with legal practise, procedures and forms for canon law, presenting and winning a case. A recent description states that "The author's aim seems to have been to give a complete guide to every sort of action which an eccleiastical lawyer might have to deal."

William outlines procedures for:

 calling witnesses
 what to do if any – including the judge – fail to appear
 liability
 punishment
 behaviour of advocates and judges
 the question of fees
 the issuing of legal documents

The Summa is very incomplete, and appears to consist of the first of the six projected books of the work. This incompleteness may be due to it being abandoned due to its scale, rather than William's death.

Drogheada was murdered by his squire, Ralph de Boklande, at this house in the parish of St Peter-in-the-East, Oxford; it is now known as Drawda Hall, on High Street, Oxford.

In January 1241 he had granted it to the abbey of Monk Sherborne on condition that they celebrated daily mass "in our church of Sherborne where my mother and father will lie after their deaths and I along with them."

References

1245 deaths
Medieval murder victims
13th-century Irish lawyers
People from Drogheda
Alumni of the University of Oxford
Irish people murdered abroad
People murdered in England
13th-century Latin writers
Year of birth unknown
Irish expatriates in England
13th-century Irish writers
Drogheda